Old Saratoga Reformed Church is a historic building  at the junction of Burgoyne and Pearl Streets in Schuylerville, Saratoga County, New York. It is part of the Reformed Church in America and was built in 1857 in the Greek Revival style. It was listed on the National Register of Historic Places in 1997.

The Old Saratoga Reformed Church was organized in 1770, and was used as a hospital during the Revolutionary War.

References

External links
Old Saratoga Reformed Church website

Reformed Church in America churches in New York (state)
Churches on the National Register of Historic Places in New York (state)
Churches completed in 1857
19th-century Reformed Church in America church buildings
Churches in Saratoga County, New York
National Register of Historic Places in Saratoga County, New York
1857 establishments in New York (state)